KXRB-FM (100.1 MHz) is a radio station broadcasting a classic country format. Licensed to Brandon, South Dakota, United States, the station serves the Sioux Falls area. The station is currently owned by Townsquare Media.

Its studios are located on Tennis Lane in Sioux Falls, while its transmitter is located near Rowena.

History
On August 7, 2017, KDEZ changed its format from adult contemporary to classic country under new KXRB-FM calls.

Previous logo

References

External links

XRB-FM
Classic country radio stations in the United States
Radio stations established in 2008
Townsquare Media radio stations
2008 establishments in South Dakota